Vladimir Prokhorov (born May 25, 1984 in Chusovoy, Perm Krai) is a Russian luger who has competed since 2000. He finished tenth in the men's doubles event at the 2008 FIL European Luge Championships in Cesana, Italy.

Neverzhitiski also finished 13th in the men's doubles event twice at the FIL World Luge Championships (2007, 2008).

References
 FIL-Luge profile

External links
 

1984 births
Living people
People from Chusovoy
Russian male lugers
Sportspeople from Perm Krai